The 2018 United States House of Representatives election in Wyoming was held on November 6, 2018 to elect the U.S. representative from Wyoming's at-large congressional district, who would represent the state of Wyoming in the 116th United States Congress. The election coincided with the 2018 U.S. mid-term elections, as well as other elections to the House of Representatives, elections to the United States Senate and various state and local elections.

Key 2018 races in Wyoming included elections for Governor, Secretary of State of Wyoming, U.S. Senate, 15 of the 30 seats in the Wyoming State Senate, and all 60 seats in the Wyoming House of Representatives.

Incumbent Republican Liz Cheney won reelection to a second term.

Primary elections to determine each party's nominee for the general election were held on August 21, 2018.

Republican primary

Candidates

Declared
Liz Cheney, incumbent, daughter of former Vice President Dick Cheney, and candidate for the U.S. Senate in 2014
Rod Miller, cowboy
Blake E. Stanley

Results

Democratic primary

Candidates

Declared
Travis Helm, businessman, attorney, and University of Wyoming College of Law graduate
Greg Hunter, former oil geologist

Results

General election

Polling

Results

See also

United States House of Representatives elections, 2018
United States elections, 2018
United States Senate election in Wyoming, 2018
Wyoming gubernatorial election, 2018
Wyoming elections, 2018

References

External links
Candidates at Vote Smart 
Candidates at Ballotpedia 
Campaign finance at FEC 
Campaign finance at OpenSecrets

 Official campaign websites
Liz Cheney (R) for Congress
Greg Hunter (D) for Congress

2018
Wyoming
United States House of Representatives